Utskarpen is a village in the municipality of Rana in Nordland county, Norway, about  west of the town of Mo i Rana.  The village is located at the end of the Utskarpen fjord, an arm of the main Ranfjorden.  On the western side of Utskarpen is the intersection with Norwegian County Road 17 and Norwegian County Road 12.  The neighboring villages are Mæla to the north and Myklebustad to the west.

Utskarpen has a kindergarten, a primary and secondary school, and a nursing home. The Utskarpen Museum was opened on 23 October 1999.  The village has been in the three municipalities. Starting in 1839 it was part of the municipality of Hemnes, then in 1929 it became a part of Sør-Rana municipality, and then in 1964 it was merged into Rana.

References

Villages in Nordland
Rana, Norway